The Shami statue is one of the main surviving works of Parthian art. It is currently in the National Museum of Iran (Inv. no. 2401) and was found at Shami (modern Khūzestān Province), where there was an ancient sanctuary.

The bronze statue is 1.94 m high. The man depicted is shown frontally. The figure's head is slightly too small in relation to the rest of its body and the face has a plain, unmodelled surface with an aquiline nose. The man bears a short beard and a heavy moustache, while his hair is long and covers the ears. Around the head he wears a wide ribbon. He wears a tunic with a V-shaped opening at the front and wears trousers. Around the neck he wears a necklace, perhaps a metal ring. The left hand and the entire right arm are missing. In Shami, however, there was found a bronze arm which might belong to this statue.

It is possible that the head and the body of the figure were crafted separately and put together in Shami, as the head is too small and made from a different type of bronze as to the rest of the statue.

The high quality of the art work caused some speculations of its production place. Some scholars believe that it was made by Greek or Roman artists. Others argue that it was produced in Palmyra or by an artist from this city, while others suggest that it was made in Susa (the nearest bigger ancient city).

The statue was found by local peasants but must have originally adorned a sanctuary at Shami, where several Hellenistic bronze statues were found. The statue depicts a nobleman from the Parthian Empire.

The statue is hard to date. Scholars have proposed various datings ranging from the 2nd century BC to the 2nd century AD.

References

Literature
 
Hans Erik Mathiesen 1992,Sculpture in the Parthian Empire, Aarhus 1992 , p. 165-167
 Curtis, Vesta Sarkhosh., 1993, "A Parthian statuette from Susa and the bronze statue from Shami." Iran 31, no. 1: 63-69.
 Lindstroem, G., 2021, The Portrait of a Hellenistic Ruler and Other Bronze Sculptures from Kal-e Chendar/Shami. Results of the 2015 and 2016 studies in the National Museum of Iran, Journal of Iran National Museum 2(1): 177-196, DOI: 10.22034/JINM.2021.252917

Weblinks 
Trudy S. Kawami, “SHAMI STATUE,” Encyclopædia Iranica, online edition, 2016, available at http://www.iranicaonline.org/articles/shami-statue (accessed on 20 October 2016).

Parthian Empire
Persian art
Archaeological discoveries in Iran
Bronze sculptures in Iran
Statues in Tehran
Parthian art